Willie Deloyd Evans (born March 5, 1984) is a former American football defensive end who last played for the Kansas City Command.

College career
He played college football at Mississippi State, where he logged 24.5 sacks, which is third on MSU's all-time leaderboard. In 2005, he registered 15.0 sacks, which is second-best in school history.

Professional career
He was signed by the New York Giants as an undrafted free agent in 2006.

Evans has also been a member of the New Orleans Saints, Carolina Panthers, Atlanta Falcons and Saskatchewan Roughriders.

External links
Atlanta Falcons bio

1984 births
Living people
People from Waynesboro, Mississippi
American football defensive ends
Mississippi State Bulldogs football players
New York Giants players
New Orleans Saints players
Amsterdam Admirals players
Carolina Panthers players
Atlanta Falcons players
Saskatchewan Roughriders players
Philadelphia Soul players
Kansas City Command players